Waldomore, also known as The Waldomore, is a two-story Neo-Classical brick mansion located in uptown Clarksburg, West Virginia, United States. The building was listed on the National Register of Historic Places on October 4, 1978.

History 
The Waldomore was constructed in late 1839 for Waldo P. Goff on part of a  tract that extended from Pike Street to Elk Creek.  The structure's name was coined by combining the names of the original owners Waldo Goff and his wife Harriet L. Moore.  The Waldomore was added to The National Register of Historic Places in 1978.  This classical revival structure was the home of Waldo Goff and his family. The Waldomore was donated to the City of Clarksburg by May Goff Lowndes (Mrs. Richard T. Lowndes) in 1930 on the condition that it was to be used as a public library or museum and for no other purpose.  It served as the Clarksburg Public Library from 1931 to 1976 when the new library was constructed next door on the same property.  The building is now the repository for materials relating to the state's culture and history as well as the books and papers of notorious UFO writer Gray Barker. It also has a collection of resources for genealogical research.

Goff Family 
The home was constructed in 1839 for Waldo P. Goff. Goff was born in 1796, the fifth son of Job and Zerviah Goff who moved to Harrison County in 1804 from New York.  Of the eight children born to this family, four sons eventually served in the Virginia State Legislators of Virginia and West Virginia.  Waldo Goff was a member of the Virginia State Senate from 1833 to 1837, and thereafter held numerous local minor offices including that of sheriff of Harrison County in 1851.  The most famous of Waldo Goff's children was Nathan Goff born at the Waldomore February 9, 1843. Nathan served as Secretary of the Navy appointed by president Rutherford B. Hayes. In 1876, Nathan Goff ran for governor and was defeated by Henry Mathews. Nathan Goff was a United States Congressman from 1883 to 1889.

See also 
 National Register of Historic Places listings in West Virginia

References

External links
Clarksburg Public Library: Waldomore

Houses on the National Register of Historic Places in West Virginia
Neoclassical architecture in West Virginia
Greek Revival houses in West Virginia
Houses completed in 1839
Buildings and structures in Clarksburg, West Virginia
Houses in Harrison County, West Virginia
National Register of Historic Places in Harrison County, West Virginia
Individually listed contributing properties to historic districts on the National Register in West Virginia